Shoqarij, also rendered as Shagharich, Shagharij, Shegharij, Shogharij, and Sagharij, may refer to:
 Shoqarij-e Olya
 Shoqarij-e Sofla